Château du Bouilh is a château in Gironde, Nouvelle-Aquitaine, France. It was made in 1786 for Jean-Frédéric de la Tour du Pin-Gouvernet by architect Victor Louis. The neoclassical semicircular château was built to host King Louis XVI on his visits to the area. Since 1864, it has been owned by the Feuilhade de Chauvin family, who in 2019 put the château and its contents up for sale for €7,350,000.

References 

Châteaux in Gironde
Monuments historiques of Gironde